Bratislava (also ; ;) is the capital and largest city of Slovakia. Officially, the population of the city is about 475,000; however, it is estimated to be more than 660,000 — approximately 140% of the official figures. Bratislava is in southwestern Slovakia at the foot of the Little Carpathians, occupying both banks of the River Danube and the left bank of the River Morava. Bordering Austria and Hungary, it is one of only two national capitals to border two sovereign states, the other one being Singapore.

The city's history has been influenced by people of many nations and religions, including Austrians, Bulgarians, Croats, Czechs, Germans, Hungarians, Jews, Romani and Slovaks. It was the coronation site and legislative center and capital of the Kingdom of Hungary from 1563 to 1783; eleven Hungarian kings and eight queens were crowned in St Martin's Cathedral. Most Hungarian parliament assemblies were held here from the 17th century until the Hungarian Reform Era, and the city has been home to many Hungarian, German and Slovak historical figures.

Today Bratislava is the political, cultural and economic centre of Slovakia. It is the seat of the Slovak president, the parliament and the Slovak Executive. It has several universities, and many museums, theatres, galleries and other cultural and educational institutions. Many of Slovakia's large businesses and financial institutions have headquarters there.

GDP at purchasing power parity is about three times higher than in other Slovak regions. Bratislava receives around 1 million tourists every year, mostly from the Czech Republic, Germany, and Austria.

Etymology 

The city received its contemporary name in 1919. Until then, it was mostly known in English as "Pressburg" (from its German name, Preßburg), since after 1526, it was dominated mostly by the Habsburg monarchy and the city had a relevant ethnic German population. That is the term from which the pre-1919 Slovak (Prešporok) and Czech (Prešpurk) names are derived.

The linguist Ján Stanislav believed the city's Hungarian name, Pozsony, to be attributed to the surname Božan, likely a prince who owned the castle before 950. Although the Latin name was also based on the same surname, according to research by the lexicologist Milan Majtán, the Hungarian version was never officially represented in official records from the time in which the prince would have lived. All three versions, however, were related to those found in Slovak, Czech and German: Vratislaburgum (905), Braslavespurch and Preslavasburc (both 907).

The medieval settlement Brezalauspurc (literally Braslav's castle) is sometimes attributed to Bratislava, but the actual location of Brezalauspurc is under scholarly debate. The city's modern name is credited to Pavol Jozef Šafárik's misinterpretation of Braslav as Bratislav in his analysis of medieval sources, which led him to invent the term Břetislaw, which later became Bratislav.

During the revolution of 1918–1919, the name 'Wilsonov' or 'Wilsonstadt' (after US President Woodrow Wilson) was proposed by American Slovaks, as he supported national self-determination. The name Bratislava, which had been used only by some Slovak patriots, became official in March 1919 with the aim that a Slavic name could support demands for the city to be part of Czechoslovakia.

In older documents, confusion can be caused by the Latin forms Bratislavia, Wratislavia etc., which refer to Wrocław, Poland, not Bratislava. The Polish city has a similar etymology despite spelling differences.

History 

The first known permanent settlement of the area began with the Linear Pottery Culture, around 5000 BC in the Neolithic era. About 200 BC, the Celtic Boii tribe founded the first significant settlement, a fortified town known as an oppidum. They also established a mint, producing silver coins known as biatecs.

The area fell under Roman influence from the 1st to the 4th century AD and was made part of the Danubian Limes, a border defence system. The Romans introduced grape growing to the area and began a tradition of winemaking, which survives to the present.

The Slavs arrived from the East between the 5th and 6th centuries during the Migration Period. As a response to onslaughts by Avars, the local Slavic tribes rebelled and established Samo's Empire (623–658), the first known Slavic political entity. In the 9th century, the castles at Bratislava (Brezalauspurk) and Devín (Dowina) were important centres of the Slavic states: the Principality of Nitra and Great Moravia. Scholars have debated the identification as fortresses of the two castles built in Great Moravia, based on linguistic arguments and because of the absence of convincing archaeological evidence.

The first written reference to a settlement named "Brezalauspurc" dates to 907 and is related to the Battle of Pressburg, during which a Bavarian army was defeated by the Hungarians. It is connected to the fall of Great Moravia, already weakened by its own inner decline and under the attacks of the Hungarians. The exact location of the battle remains unknown, and some interpretations place it west of Lake Balaton.

In the 10th century, the territory of Pressburg (what would later become Pozsony county) became part of Hungary (called the "Kingdom of Hungary" from 1000). It developed as a key economic and administrative centre on the kingdom's frontier. This strategic position destined the city to be the site of frequent attacks and battles, but also brought it economic development and high political status. It was granted its first known "town privileges" in 1291 by the Hungarian King Andrew III, and was declared a free royal town in 1405 by King Sigismund. In 1436 he authorized the town to use its own coat of arms.

The Kingdom of Hungary was defeated by the Ottoman Empire in the Battle of Mohács in 1526. The Ottomans besieged and damaged Pressburg, but failed to conquer it. Owing to Ottoman advances into Hungarian territory, the city was designated the new capital of Hungary in 1536, after becoming part of the Habsburg monarchy and marking the beginning of a new era. The city became a coronation town and the seat of kings, archbishops (1543), the nobility and all major organisations and offices. Between 1536 and 1830, eleven Hungarian kings and queens were crowned at St. Martin's Cathedral. The 17th century was marked by anti-Habsburg uprisings, fighting with the Ottomans, floods, plagues and other disasters, which diminished the population.

Pressburg flourished during the 18th-century reign of Queen Maria Theresa, becoming the largest and most important town in Hungary. The population tripled; many new palaces, monasteries, mansions, and streets were built, and the city was the centre of social and cultural life of the region. Wolfgang Amadeus Mozart gave a concert in 1762 in the Pálffy Palace. Joseph Haydn performed in 1784 in the Grassalkovich Palace. Ludwig van Beethoven was a guest in 1796 in the Keglević Palace.

The city started to lose its importance under the reign of Maria Theresa's son Joseph II, especially after the crown jewels were taken to Vienna in 1783 in an attempt to strengthen the relations between Austria and Hungary. Many central offices subsequently moved to Buda, followed by a large segment of the nobility. The first newspapers in Hungarian and Slovak were published here: Magyar hírmondó in 1780, and Presspurske Nowiny in 1783. In the course of the 18th century, the city became a centre for the Slovak national movement.

The city's 19th-century history was closely tied to the major events in Europe. The Peace of Pressburg between Austria and France was signed here in 1805. Theben Castle was ruined by Napoleon's French troops during an invasion of 1809. In 1825 the Hungarian National Learned Society (the present Hungarian Academy of Sciences) was founded in Pressburg using a donation from István Széchenyi. In 1843 Hungarian was proclaimed the official language in legislation, public administration, and education by the Diet in the city.

As a reaction to the Revolutions of 1848, Ferdinand V signed the so-called April laws, which included the abolition of serfdom, at the Primate's Palace. The city chose the revolutionary Hungarian side, but was captured by the Austrians in December 1848.

Industry developed rapidly in the 19th century. The first horse-drawn railway in the Kingdom of Hungary, from Pressburg to Szentgyörgy (Svätý Jur), was built in 1840. A new line to Vienna using steam locomotives was opened in 1848, and a line to Pest in 1850. Many new industrial, financial and other institutions were founded; for example, the first bank in present-day Slovakia was founded in 1842. The city's first permanent bridge over the Danube, Starý most, was built in 1891.
  
Before World War I, the city had a population that was 42% German, 41% Hungarian and 15% Slovak (1910 census, the population was influenced by Magyarization). The first post war census in 1919 declared the city's ethnic composition at 36% German, 33% Slovak and 29% Hungarian but this may have reflected changing self-identification, rather than an exchange of peoples. Many people were bi- or trilingual and multicultural. After World War I and the formation of Czechoslovakia on October 28, 1918, the city was incorporated into the new state despite its representatives' reluctance. The dominant Hungarian and German population tried to prevent annexation of the city to Czechoslovakia and declared it a free city. However, the Czechoslovak Legions occupied the city on January 1, 1919, and made it part of Czechoslovakia, against the wish of the local population, on reasons of its economic importance for the new state. The city became the seat of Slovakia's political organs and organizations and became Slovakia's capital on 4 February. On February 12, 1919, the German and Hungarian population started a protest against the Czechoslovak occupation. According to Marcell Jankovics, lawyer, publicist and member of the Hungarian Parliament, the Czechoslovak Legions opened fire on the unarmed demonstrators. Slovak sources do not deny the shooting, but add that the Legionaries were defending themselves from violent and aggressive behavior of the demonstrators. A contemporary Slovak language newspaper reported that "a mob spat on our soldiers, tore down badges from their hats, physically attacked them and shot on them from windows."

On March 27, 1919, the name Bratislava was officially adopted for the first time to replace the previous Slovak name Prešporok. Left without any protection after the retreat of the Hungarian army, many Hungarians were expelled or fled. Czechs and Slovaks moved their households to Bratislava. Education in Hungarian and German was radically reduced in the city. By the 1930 Czechoslovak census, the Hungarian population of Bratislava had decreased to 15.8% (see the Demographics of Bratislava article for more details).

In 1938, Nazi Germany annexed neighbouring Austria in the Anschluss; later that year it also annexed the still-separate from Bratislava Petržalka and Devín boroughs on ethnic grounds, as these had many ethnic Germans. Bratislava was declared the capital of the first independent Slovak Republic on March 14, 1939, but the new state quickly fell under Nazi influence. In 1941–1942 and 1944–1945, the new Slovak government cooperated in deporting most of Bratislava's approximately 15,000 Jews; they were transported to concentration camps, where most were killed or died before the end of the war in the Holocaust.

Bratislava was bombarded by the Allies, occupied by German troops in 1944, and eventually taken by troops of the Soviet 2nd Ukrainian Front on 4 April 1945. At the end of World War II, most of Bratislava's ethnic Germans were evacuated by the German authorities. A few returned after the war, but were soon expelled without their properties under the Beneš decrees, part of a widespread expulsion of ethnic Germans from eastern Europe.

After the Communist Party seized power in Czechoslovakia in February 1948, the city became part of the Eastern Bloc. The city annexed new land, and the population rose significantly, becoming 90% Slovak. Large residential areas consisting of high-rise prefabricated panel buildings, such as those in the Petržalka borough, were built. The Communist government also built several new grandiose buildings, such as the Most Slovenského národného povstania bridge and the Slovak Radio headquarters.

In 1968, after the unsuccessful Czechoslovak attempt to liberalise the Communist regime, the city was occupied by Warsaw Pact troops. Shortly thereafter, it became capital of the Slovak Socialist Republic, one of the two states of the federalized Czechoslovakia.

Bratislava's dissidents anticipated the fall of Communism with the Bratislava candle demonstration in 1988, and the city became one of the foremost centres of the anti-Communist Velvet Revolution in 1989.

In 1993, the city became the capital of the newly formed Slovak Republic following the Velvet Divorce.

Geography 

Bratislava is situated in southwestern Slovakia, within the Bratislava Region. Its location on the borders with Austria and Hungary makes it the only national capital that borders between two countries. It is only  from the border with Hungary and only  from the Austrian capital Vienna.

Bratislava straddles the Danube River, along which it had developed and for centuries the chief transportation route to other areas. The river passes through the city from the west to the southeast. The Middle Danube basin begins at Devín Gate in western Bratislava. Other rivers are the Morava River, which forms the northwestern border of the city and enters the Danube at Devín, the Little Danube, and the Vydrica, which enters the Danube in the borough of Karlova Ves.

The Carpathian mountain range begins in city territory with the Little Carpathians (Malé Karpaty). The Záhorie and Danubian lowlands stretch into Bratislava.

Climate 
It is often windy with a marked variation between hot summers and cold, humid winters. The city is in one of the warmest and driest parts of Slovakia.

Recently, the transitions from winter to summer and summer to winter have been rapid, with short autumn and spring periods. Snow occurs less frequently than previously. Extreme temperatures (1981–2013) – record high: , record low: . Some areas, particularly Devín and Devínska Nová Ves, are vulnerable to floods from the Danube and Morava rivers. New flood protection has been built on both banks.

Location

Cityscape and architecture 

The cityscape of Bratislava is characterized by medieval towers and grandiose 20th-century buildings, but it underwent profound changes in a construction boom at the start of the 21st century.

Most historical buildings are concentrated in the Old Town. Bratislava's Town Hall is a complex of three buildings erected in the 14th–15th centuries and now hosts the Bratislava City Museum. Michael's Gate is the only gate that has been preserved from the medieval fortifications, and it ranks among the oldest of the town's buildings; the narrowest house in Europe is nearby. The University Library building, erected in 1756, was used by the Diet of the Kingdom of Hungary from 1802 to 1848. Much of the significant legislation of the Hungarian Reform Era (such as the abolition of serfdom and the foundation of the Hungarian Academy of Sciences) was enacted there.

The historic centre is characterized by many baroque palaces. The Grassalkovich Palace, built around 1760, is now the residence of the Slovak president, and the Slovak government now has its seat in the former Archiepiscopal Palace. In 1805, diplomats of emperors Napoleon and Francis II signed the fourth Peace of Pressburg in the Primate's Palace, after Napoleon's victory in the Battle of Austerlitz. Some smaller houses are historically significant; composer Johann Nepomuk Hummel was born in an 18th-century house in the Old Town.

Notable cathedrals and churches include the Gothic St. Martin's Cathedral built in the 13th–16th centuries, which served as the coronation church of the Kingdom of Hungary between 1563 and 1830. The Franciscan Church, dating to the 13th century, has been a place of knighting ceremonies and is the oldest preserved sacral building in the city. The Church of St. Elizabeth, better known as the Blue Church due to its colour, is built entirely in the Hungarian Secessionist style. Bratislava has one surviving functioning synagogue, out of the three major ones existing before the holocaust.

A curiosity is the underground (formerly ground-level) restored portion of the Jewish cemetery where 19th-century Rabbi Moses Sofer is buried, located at the base of the castle hill near the entrance to a tram tunnel. The only military cemetery in Bratislava is Slavín, unveiled in 1960 in honour of Soviet Army soldiers who fell during the liberation of Bratislava in April 1945. It offers an excellent view of the city and the Little Carpathians.

Other prominent 20th-century structures include the Most Slovenského národného povstania (Bridge of the Slovak national uprising) across the Danube featuring a UFO-like tower restaurant, Slovak Radio's inverted-pyramid-shaped headquarters, and the uniquely designed Kamzík TV Tower with an observation deck and rotating restaurant. In the early 21st century, new edifices have transformed the traditional cityscape. At the beginning of the 21st century, a construction boom has spawned new public structures, such as the Most Apollo and a new building of the Slovak National Theatre, as well as private real-estate development.

Bratislava Castle 

The castle hill site has been inhabited since the transitional period between the Stone and Bronze ages and has been the acropolis of a Celtic town, part of the Roman limes Romanus, a huge Slavic fortified settlement, and a political, military and religious centre for Great Moravia. A stone castle was not constructed until the 10th century, when the area was part of the Kingdom of Hungary, however, in the 9th century a pre-romanesque stone basilica, was standing in the area of the hillfort.

The castle was converted into a Gothic anti-Hussite fortress under Sigismund of Luxemburg in 1430, became a Renaissance castle in 1562, and was rebuilt in 1649 in the baroque style. Under Queen Maria Theresa, the castle became a prestigious royal seat. In 1811, the castle was inadvertently destroyed by fire and lay in ruins until the 1950s, when it was rebuilt mostly in its former Theresian style. In the 1940s, it was planned to demolish the castle ruins and replace them with a new university complex. However, it was never realised, and in the 1960s, reconstruction began. Nowadays, it serves ceremonial purposes and as a historical museum of the Slovak National Museum.

Devín Castle 

The ruined and recently renovated Devín Castle is in the borough of Devín, on top of a rock where the Morava River, which forms the border between Austria and Slovakia, enters the Danube. It is one of the most important Slovak archaeological sites and contains a museum dedicated to its history. Due to its strategic location, Devín Castle was a very important frontier castle of Great Moravia and the early Hungarian state. It was destroyed by Napoleon's troops in 1809. It is an important symbol of Slovak and Slavic history.

Rusovce 
Rusovce mansion, with its English park, is in the Rusovce borough. The house was originally built in the 17th century and was turned into an English neo-Gothic-style mansion in 1841–1844. The borough is also known for the ruins of the Roman military camp Gerulata, part of limes Romanus, a border defence system. Gerulata was built and used between the 1st and 4th centuries AD.

Parks and lakes 

Due to its location in the foothills of the Little Carpathians and its riparian vegetation on the Danubian floodplains, Bratislava has forests close to the city centre.
The largest city park is Horský park (literally, Mountainous Park), in the Old Town. Bratislavský lesný park (Bratislava Forest Park) is located in the Little Carpathians and includes many locales popular among visitors, such as Železná studienka and Koliba. On the right bank of the Danube, in the borough of Petržalka, is Janko Kráľ Park founded in 1774–76. A new city park is planned for Petržalka between the Malý Draždiak and Veľký Draždiak lakes.

Bratislava's zoological park is located in Mlynská dolina, near the headquarters of Slovak Television. The zoo, founded in 1960, currently houses 152 species of animals, including the rare white lion and white tiger. The Botanical Gardens, which belong to Comenius University, can be found on the Danube riverfront and house more than 120 species of domestic and foreign origin.

The city has a number of natural and man-made lakes, most of which are used for recreation. Examples include Štrkovec lake in Ružinov, Kuchajda in Nové Mesto, Zlaté Piesky and the Vajnory lakes in the north-east, and Rusovce lake in the south, which is popular with nudists.

Demographics 

From the city's origin until the 19th century, Germans were the dominant ethnic group. By the end of World War I, 42% of the population of Pressburg spoke German as their native language, 40% Hungarian, and 15% Slovak.

After the formation of the Czechoslovak Republic in 1918, Bratislava remained a multi-ethnic city, but with a different demographic trend. Due to Slovakization, the proportion of Slovaks and Czechs increased in the city, while the proportion of Germans and Hungarians fell. In 1938, 59% of population were Slovaks or Czechs, while Germans represented 22% and Hungarians 13% of the city's population. The creation of the first Slovak Republic in 1939 brought other changes, most notably the expulsion of many Czechs and the deportation or flight of the Jews during the Holocaust. In 1945, most of the Germans were evacuated. After the restoration of Czechoslovakia, the Beneš decrees (partly revoked in 1948) collectively punished ethnic German and Hungarian minorities by expropriation and deportation to Germany, Austria, and Hungary for their alleged collaborationism with Nazi Germany and Hungary against Czechoslovakia.

The city thereby obtained its clearly Slovak character. Hundreds of citizens were expelled during the communist oppression of the 1950s, with the aim of replacing "reactionary" people with the proletarian class. Since the 1950s, the Slovaks have been the dominant ethnicity in the town, making up around 90% of the city's population.

Politics 

Bratislava is the seat of the Slovak parliament, presidency, ministries, supreme court, and central bank. It is the seat of the Bratislava Region and, since 2002, also of the Bratislava Self-Governing Region. The city also has many foreign embassies and consulates.

The current local government (Mestská samospráva) structure has been in place since 1990. It is composed of a mayor (primátor), a city board (Mestská rada), a city council (Mestské zastupiteľstvo), city commissions (Komisie mestského zastupiteľstva), and a city magistrate's office (Magistrát).

The mayor, based at the Primate's Palace, is the city's top executive officer and is elected to a four-year term of office. The current mayor of Bratislava is Matúš Vallo, who won the election held on October 29, 2022, as an independent candidate. The city council is the city's legislative body, responsible for issues such as budget, local ordinances, city planning, road maintenance, education, and culture.

City Council 
The Bratislava City Council is the legislature of the City of Bratislava. It has 45 members. The Council usually convenes once a month and consists of 45 members elected to four-year terms concurrent with the mayor's. Many of the council's executive functions are carried out by the city commission at the council's direction. The city board is a 28-member body composed of the mayor and his deputies, the borough mayors, and up to ten city council members. The board is an executive and supervisory arm of the city council and also serves in an advisory role to the mayor.

Administration 
Administratively, Bratislava is divided into five districts: Bratislava I (the city centre), Bratislava II (eastern parts), Bratislava III (north-eastern parts), Bratislava IV (western and northern parts) and Bratislava V (southern parts on the right bank of the Danube, including Petržalka, the most densely populated residential area in Central Europe).

For self-governance purposes, the city is divided into 17 boroughs, each of which has its own mayor (starosta) and council. The number of councillors in each depends on the size and population of the borough. Each of the boroughs coincides with the city's 20 cadastral areas, except for two cases: Nové Mesto is further divided into the Nové Mesto and Vinohrady cadastral areas and Ružinov is divided into Ružinov, Nivy and Trnávka. Further unofficial division recognizes additional quarters and localities.

Economy 

The Bratislava Region is the wealthiest and most economically prosperous region in Slovakia, despite being the smallest by area and having the third smallest population of the eight Slovak regions. It accounts for about 26% of the Slovak GDP.

The average monthly salary in the Bratislava region in 2022 was €1 908.

According to GDP per capita, Bratislava was the sixth-richest region in the European Union in 2016. However, analysts have noted that the Bratislava region's ranking is exaggerated for several reasons. The GDP of the Bratislava region takes into account the activities of companies with headquarters in the capital but who also have significant operations elsewhere. Moreover, Volkswagen Slovakia, the largest automaker in Slovakia, is located in the Bratislava region but is owned by VW, giving the impression that the area is extremely rich. As a result, almost 30 percent of Slovakia's GDP is created in Bratislava.

The unemployment rate in Bratislava was 1.83% in December 2007. Many governmental institutions and private companies have their headquarters in Bratislava. More than 75% of Bratislava's population works in the service sector, mainly composed of trade, banking, IT, telecommunications, and tourism. The Bratislava Stock Exchange (BSSE), the organiser of the public securities market, was founded on 15 March 1991.

Companies operating predominantly in Bratislava with the highest value added according to the 2018 Trend Top 200 ranking, include the Volkswagen Bratislava Plant, Slovnaft refinery (MOL), Eset (software developer), Asseco (software company), PPC Power (producer of heat and steam) and Trenkwalder personnel agency.

Volkswagen Group took over and expanded the BAZ factory in 1991, and has since considerably expanded production beyond original Skoda Auto models. Currently, 68% of production is focused on SUVs: Audi Q7; VW Touareg; as well as the body and under-chassis of the Porsche Cayenne. Since 2012, production has also included the Volkswagen up!, SEAT Mii and Skoda Citigo.

In recent years, service and high-tech-oriented businesses have prospered in Bratislava. Many global companies, including IBM, Dell, Lenovo, AT&T, SAP, Amazon, Johnson Controls, Swiss Re and Accenture, have built outsourcing and service centres here or plan to do so soon. Reasons for the influx of multi-national corporations include proximity to Western Europe, skilled labour force and the high density of universities and research facilities. Also Slovak IT companies included ESET, Sygic and Pixel Federation have headquarters in Bratislava.

Other large companies and employers with headquarters in Bratislava include Slovak Telekom, Orange Slovensko, Slovenská sporiteľňa, Tatra banka, Doprastav, Hewlett-Packard Slovakia, Slovnaft, Henkel Slovensko,  Slovenský plynárenský priemysel, Kraft Foods Slovakia, Whirlpool Slovakia, Železnice Slovenskej republiky, AeroMobil, and Tesco Stores Slovak Republic.

The Slovak economy's strong growth in the 2000s has led to a boom in the construction industry, and several major projects have been completed or are planned in Bratislava. Areas attracting developers include the Danube riverfront, where two major projects are already finished: River Park in the Old Town, and Eurovea near the Apollo Bridge. Other locations under development include the areas around the main railway and bus stations, the former industrial zone near the Old Town and in the boroughs of Petržalka, Nové Mesto and Ružinov. It is expected that investors will spend €1.2 billion on new projects by 2010. 
In 2010 the city had a balanced budget of €277 million, with one fifth used for investment. Bratislava holds shares in 17 companies directly, including the city's public transport company Dopravný podnik Bratislava, the waste collection and disposal company named OLO (Odvoz a likvidácia odpadu), and the water utility. The city also manages municipal organisations such as the city police (Mestská polícia), Bratislava City Museum and ZOO Bratislava.

Tourism 

In 2006, Bratislava had 77 commercial accommodation facilities, of which 45 were hotels, with a total capacity of 9,940 beds. A total of 986,201 visitors, 754,870 of whom were foreigners, stayed overnight. Altogether, visitors made 1,338,497 overnight stays. However, a considerable share of visits is made by those who visit Bratislava for a single day, and their exact number is not known. The largest numbers of foreign visitors come from the Czech Republic, Germany, the United Kingdom, Italy, Poland and Austria.

Among other factors, the growth of low-cost airline flights to Bratislava, led by Ryanair, has led to conspicuous stag parties, primarily from the UK. While these are a boom to the city's tourism industry, cultural differences and vandalism have led to concern by local officials. Reflecting the popularity of rowdy parties in Bratislava in the early to mid-2000s, the city was a setting in the 2004 comedy film Eurotrip, which was actually filmed in the city of Prague, the Czech Republic.

Shopping 

Bratislava has eight major shopping centres: Aupark, Avion Shopping Park, Bory Mall, Central, Eurovea, Nivy Centrum, Vivo! (formerly Polus City Center) and Shopping Palace.

A month before Christmas the Main Square in Bratislava is illuminated by a Christmas tree and the Christmas market stalls are officially opened. Around 100 booths are opened every year. It is opened most of the day as well as in the evening.

Culture 
Bratislava is the cultural heart of Slovakia. Owing to its historical multi-cultural character, local culture is influenced by various ethnic and religious groups, including Germans, Slovaks, Hungarians, and Jews. Bratislava enjoys numerous theatres, museums, galleries, concert halls, cinemas, film clubs, and foreign cultural institutions.

Performing arts 

Bratislava is the seat of the Slovak National Theatre, housed in two buildings. The first is a Neo-Renaissance theatre building situated in the Old Town at the end of Hviezdoslav Square. The new building, opened to the public in 2007, is on the riverfront. The theatre has three ensembles: opera, ballet and drama. Smaller theatres include the Bratislava Puppet Theatre, the Astorka Korzo '90 theatre, the Arena Theatre, L+S Studio, and the Naive Theatre of Radošina.

Music in Bratislava flourished in the 18th century and was closely linked to Viennese musical life. Mozart visited the town at the age of six. Among other notable composers who visited or lived in the town were Haydn, Liszt, Bartók and Beethoven. It is also the birthplace of the composers Johann Nepomuk Hummel, Ernő Dohnányi, and Franz Schmidt. Bratislava is home to both the Slovak Philharmonic Orchestra and the chamber orchestra, Capella Istropolitana. The city hosts several annual festivals, such as the Bratislava Music Festival and Bratislava Jazz Days. The Wilsonic Festival, held annually since 2000, brings dozens of international musical acts to the city each year. During the summer, various musical events take place as part of the Bratislava Cultural Summer at Bratislava Castle. Apart from musical festivals, it is possible to hear music ranging from underground to well known pop stars.

Bratislava is home to two of Slovakia's national folk dance ensembles, Lúčnica and Slovenský ľudový umelecký kolektív (SĽUK).

Museums and galleries 

The Slovak National Museum (Slovenské národné múzeum), founded in 1961, has its headquarters in Bratislava on the riverfront in the Old Town, along with the Natural History Museum, which is one of its subdivisions. It is the largest cultural institution in Slovakia, and manages 16 specialized museums in Bratislava and beyond. The Bratislava City Museum (Múzeum mesta Bratislavy), established in 1868, is the oldest museum in continuous operation in Slovakia. Its primary goal is to chronicle Bratislava's history in various forms from the earliest periods using historical and archaeological collections. It offers permanent displays in eight specialised museums.

The Slovak National Gallery, founded in 1948, offers the most extensive network of galleries in Slovakia. Two displays in Bratislava are next to one another at Esterházy Palace (Esterházyho palác, Eszterházy palota) and the Water Barracks (Vodné kasárne, Vizikaszárnya) on the Danube riverfront in the Old Town. The Bratislava City Gallery, founded in 1961, is the second-largest Slovak gallery of its kind. The gallery offers permanent displays at Pálffy Palace (Pálffyho palác, Pálffy palota) and Mirbach Palace (Mirbachov palác, Mirbach palota), in the Old Town. Danubiana Art Museum, one of the youngest art museums in Europe, is near Čunovo waterworks.

Media 
As the national capital, Bratislava is home to national and many local media outlets. Notable TV stations based in the city include Slovak Television (Slovenská televízia), Markíza, JOJ and TA3. Slovak Radio (Slovenský rozhlas) has its seat in the centre, and many Slovak commercial radio stations are based in the city. National newspapers based in Bratislava include SME, Pravda, Nový čas, Hospodárske noviny and the English-language The Slovak Spectator. Two news agencies are headquartered there: the News Agency of the Slovak Republic (TASR) and the Slovak News Agency (SITA).

Sport 

Various sports and sports teams have a long tradition in Bratislava, with many teams and individuals competing in Slovak and international leagues and competitions.

Football is currently represented by the only club playing in the top Slovak football league, the Fortuna Liga. ŠK Slovan Bratislava, founded in 1919, has its home ground at the Tehelné pole stadium. ŠK Slovan is the most successful football club in Slovak history, being the only club from the former Czechoslovakia to win the European football competition the Cup Winners' Cup, in 1969.
FC Petržalka akadémia is the oldest of Bratislava's football clubs, founded in 1898, and is based at Stadium FC Petržalka 1898 in Petržalka (formerly at Pasienky in Nové Mesto and Štadión Petržalka in Petržalka). They are currently the only Slovak team to win at least one match in the UEFA Champions League group stage, with a 5–0 win over Celtic FC in the qualifying round being the most well-known, alongside a 3–2 win over FC Porto. Before then FC Košice in the 1997–98 season lost all six matches, despite being the first Slovak side since independence to play in the competition.

In 2010 Artmedia were relegated from the Corgon Liga under their new name of MFK Petržalka, finishing 12th and bottom. FC Petržalka akadémia currently competes in 5. liga after bankruptcy in summer 2014. Another known club from the city is FK Inter Bratislava. Founded in 1945, they have their home ground at Stadium ŠKP Inter Dúbravka in Dúbravka, (formerly at Štadión Pasienky) and currently plays in the 3. liga. There are many more clubs with long tradition and successful history despite the lack of success in last years, e.g. LP Domino Bratislava currently playing in 4. liga; FK Rača Bratislava competing in the 3. liga as well as Inter; FK ŠKP Inter Dúbravka Bratislava, following ŠKP Devín (successful team from the 1990s) and partially following the original Inter (original Inter bankrupted in 2009, sold the Corgoň Liga license to FK Senica and legally merged with FC ŠKP Dúbravka; current Inter has taken over the tradition, name, colours, fans etc., but legally is no successor of the original Inter); FC Tatran Devín, the club that was successful mostly at youth level and merged with ŠKP Bratislava in 1995; MŠK Iskra Petržalka, playing under the name ŠK Iskra Matadorfix Bratislava in the former 1st League (today 2nd) in 1997/98.

Bratislava is home to three winter sports arenas: Ondrej Nepela Winter Sports Stadium, V. Dzurilla Winter Sports Stadium, and Dúbravka Winter Sports Stadium. The HC Slovan Bratislava ice hockey team has represented Bratislava from the 2012–13 season in the Kontinental Hockey League. Slovnaft Arena, a part of Ondrej Nepela Winter Sports Stadium, is home to HC Slovan. The Ice Hockey World Championships in 1959 and 1992 were played in Bratislava, and the 2011 World Championship were held in Bratislava and Košice, for which a new arena was built. The city also played host to the World Championship in 2019.

The Čunovo Water Sports Centre is a whitewater slalom and rafting area, close to the Gabčíkovo dam. It hosts several international and national canoe and kayak competitions annually.

In 1966, Bratislava named its new multi-sports stadium after tennis player Ladislav Hecht.

The National Tennis Centre, which includes Aegon Arena, hosts various cultural, sporting and social events. Several Davis Cup matches have been played there, including the 2005 Davis Cup final. The city is represented in the top Slovak leagues in women's and men's basketball, women's handball and volleyball, and men's water polo. The Devín–Bratislava National run is the oldest athletic event in Slovakia, and the Bratislava City Marathon has been held annually since 2006. A race track is located in Petržalka, where horse racing and dog racing events and dog shows are held regularly.

Bratislava is also the centre of rugby union in Slovakia.

Education and science 

The first university in Bratislava, in the Kingdom of Hungary (and also in the territory of present-day Slovakia) was Universitas Istropolitana, founded in 1465 by King Matthias Corvinus. It was closed in 1490 after his death.

Bratislava is the seat of the largest university (Comenius University, 27,771 students), the largest technical university (Slovak University of Technology, 18,473 students), and the oldest art schools (the Academy of Performing Arts and the Academy of Fine Arts and Design) in Slovakia. Other institutions of tertiary education are the public University of Economics and the first private college in Slovakia, City University of Seattle. In total, about 56,000 students attend university in Bratislava.

There are 65 public primary schools, nine private primary schools and ten religious primary schools. Overall, they enroll 25,821 pupils. The city's system of secondary education (some middle schools and all high schools) consists of 39 gymnasia with 16,048 students, 37 specialized high schools with 10,373 students, and 27 vocational schools with 8,863 students (data ).

The Slovak Academy of Sciences is also based in Bratislava. However, the city is one of the few European capitals to have neither an observatory nor a planetarium.

Transport 

The geographical position of Bratislava in Central Europe has long made it a natural crossroads for international trade traffic.

Public transport in Bratislava is managed by Dopravný podnik Bratislava, a city-owned company. The transport system is known as Mestská hromadná doprava (MHD, Municipal Mass Transit) and employs buses, trams, and trolleybuses. Most of the Bratislava public transport is coated in a typical color combination of red and black.

Bratislava is also part of an integrated system, IDS BK, connecting city public transport with other transport companies in the Bratislava region. Traveling with a single ticket is possible throughout the system network, both in Bratislava and to the nearby villages and cities, including 3 other districts of Senec, Malacky, and Pezinok.

As a rail hub, the city has direct connections to Austria, Hungary, the Czech Republic, Poland, Germany, Croatia, Slovenia, and the rest of Slovakia. Bratislava-Petržalka railway station and Bratislava Main station are the principal railway stations.

The main bus station (Autobusová stanica Mlynské Nivy or AS Mlynské Nivy) is located at Mlynské Nivy, east of the city centre, and offers both bus connections to cities in Slovakia and international bus lines. A new bus station attached to a shopping mall, administration centre, and Bratislava's tallest skyscraper, Nivy Tower, was opened on the 30th of September 2021.

The motorway system provides direct access to Brno in the Czech Republic, Vienna in Austria, Budapest in Hungary, Trnava, and other points in Slovakia. The A6 motorway between Bratislava and Vienna was opened in November 2007.

The Port of Bratislava is one of the two international river ports in Slovakia. The port provides access to the Black Sea via the Danube and to the North Sea through the Rhine–Main–Danube Canal. Additionally, tourist lines operate from Bratislava's passenger port, including routes to Devín, Vienna, and elsewhere. In Bratislava there are currently six bridges standing over the Danube (ordered by the flow of the river): Most Lafranconi (Lafranconi Bridge), Most SNP (Bridge of the Slovak National Uprising), Starý most (The Old Bridge), Most Apollo (Apollo Bridge), Prístavný most (The Harbor Bridge) and Lužný most (The Floodplain bridge).

Bratislava's M. R. Štefánik Airport is the main international airport in Slovakia. It serves civil and governmental, scheduled and unscheduled domestic and international flights. The current runways support the landing for all common types of aircraft. It served 2,024,000 passengers in 2007.

International relations

Twin towns – sister cities
Bratislava is twinned with:

 Brno, Czech Republic
 Székesfehérvár, Hungary
 Kraków, Poland
 Warsaw, Poland
 Perugia, Italy (1962)
 Ljubljana, Slovenia (1967)
 Yerevan, Armenia (2001)
 Larnaca, Cyprus (1989)
 Turku, Finland (1976)
 Bremen, Germany (1989)
 Alexandria, Egypt
 Kyiv, Ukraine
 Cleveland, United States

* Numbers in parentheses list the year of twinning. The first agreement was signed with the city of Perugia in Italy on 18 July 1962.

Notable people

Honorary citizens
People who have received the honorary citizenship of Bratislava are:

Image gallery

See also
 Apollo Arena Bratislava
 Central European Forum
 List of fountains in Bratislava
 List of municipalities and towns in Slovakia
 List of streets in Bratislava

Notes

References

Genealogical resources 
The records for genealogical research are available at the state archive "Statny Archiv in Bratislava, Slovakia"
 Roman Catholic church records (births/marriages/deaths): 1601–1897 (parish A)
 Lutheran church records (births/marriages/deaths): 1606–1919 (parish A)

External links

Official sites 
 Official Tourism and Travel Guide to Bratislava
 Official Slovak National Tourism Portal

Tourism and living information 
 Public urban transport in Bratislava

 
 
Capitals in Europe
Cities and towns in Slovakia
Populated places on the Danube
907 establishments
Populated places established in the 10th century